Harro Magnussen (14 May 1861 – 3 November 1908) was a German sculptor.

Life 
Magnussen was born in Hamm, and received his first lessons in drawing, modelling and carving wood from his father, the painter Christian Carl Magnussen. In 1882, he began his formal training in Munich with Nikolaus Gysis, Gabriel von Hackl and Ludwig von Löfftz. Despite being in Munich, he was most impressed by works from the Berliner Bildhauerschule (Berlin School of Sculpture) and went there in 1888, where he obtained a position in the studios of Reinhold Begas, remaining for five years. In 1889, he produced a bust of Otto von Bismarck that sold over 1,000 copies in plaster and bronze over the next ten years.

He became a free-lance sculptor in 1893 and entered several competitions for contracts, but with little success. In 1899, his smaller works attracted the attention of Kaiser Wilhelm II, who commissioned him to do a figure of the dying Frederick the Great. This finally brought him to public attention and he was awarded one of the coveted commissions for Wilhelm's ambitious Siegesallee project. His work on that project earned him the Order of the Crown, Class IV.

He committed suicide in Grunewald by asphyxiation with gas. Due to "suggestive evidence" (not specified), his death was briefly investigated as a possible murder by strangulation.

Selected major works 
 1898: Monument for Johannes Honterus at the Biserica Neagră (Black Church) in Kronstadt (now Brașov)
 1898: "Der Philosoph von Sanssouci in seinen letzten Stunden" (The Philosopher of Sanssouci in his Last Hours), in Frederick the Great's death chamber, later in the Monbijou Palace Berlin; missing since World War II
 1899: Statue of Fredrick the Great "im Alter seiner Thronbesteigung" (at the age of succession) for the White Hall in the Stadtschloss Berlin
 1900: Monument for Maria of Jever, in the Castle Park, Jever
 1900: Siegesallee Group 20: Consisting of Joachim II Hector, Elector of Brandenburg as the central figure, flanked by figures of George, Margrave of Brandenburg-Ansbach and Matthias von Jagow. All of the statues in the Siegesallee were damaged during World War II. Joachim Hector lost his head.
 1901/02: Marble statues of Bismarck, Moltke and Roon for the Oberlausitzer Ruhmeshalle (Hall of Fame) in Görlitz; missing since 1945.
 1904: Monument for Albrecht von Roon, Großer Stern, Berlin. It has since been given a new pedestal.
 1905: Statue of Elector Joachim II for the interior of the Berliner Dom
 1906: Statue of Kaiser Wilhelm I in Bonn; also now with a new pedestal.

References

Further reading 
 Peter Bloch, Sibylle Einholz: Ethos & Pathos – Die Berliner Bildhauerschule 1786–1914. Berlin 1990 (Exhibition catalog), Mann, Berlin,  
 Peter Bloch, Waldemar Grzimek: Die Berliner Bildhauerschule im neunzehnten Jahrhundert. – Das klassische Berlin, Berlin 1978 (New edition, 1994) Propyläen-Verlag, Vienna,  
 Uta Lehnert: Der Kaiser und die Siegesallee – Réclame Royale. Dietrich Reimer, Berlin 1998,  
 Bernhard Maaz: Nationalgalerie Berlin. Das XIX. Jahrhundert – Catalog of the sculpture collection, Berlin 2006
 Eckart Schörle: Harro Magnussen (1861–1908) – Ein Bildhauer der Jahrhundertwende zwischen Anpassung und Eigensinn. In: Nordelbingen (periodical), Vol.71. 2002. Pgs.75–110

External links 

German sculptors
German male sculptors
1861 births
1908 deaths
Academy of Fine Arts, Munich alumni
1908 suicides